José Elias Moedim Júnior (born 25 September 1976), commonly known as Zé Elias, is a Brazilian football pundit and retired footballer. A defensive or central midfielder, he played for 12 teams in seven countries. He is a football analyst for ESPN Brasil.

Club career
Born in Guarulhos, Zé Elias was one of the youngest players to ever appear for Sport Club Corinthians Paulista. He had already gained strong interest from PSV Eindhoven during his beginnings as a senior, which happened at the age of 17.

After becoming an undisputed starter at Corinthians, and first appearing for the Brazil national team at 19, Zé Elias went overseas, representing with moderate individual success Bayer 04 Leverkusen, Inter Milan, Bologna F.C. 1909, Olympiacos F.C. and Genoa CFC. He won three consecutive Superleague Greece championships with the fourth club, but appeared sparingly in the process (a maximum of 18 league appearances).

After a return to Brazil with Santos FC, Zé Elias had short-lived stints with FC Metalurh Donetsk, Guarani Futebol Clube, AC Omonia and Londrina Esporte Clube. He retired as a player in March 2008, and assumed a scouting role in Brazil for Inter Milan; however, in June, he signed a contract with SC Rheindorf Altach for the 2008–09 season, before announcing his retirement again.

International career
Zé Elias was capped ten times for Brazil. He received his first call-up on 29 March 1995, in a friendly with Honduras which ended 1–1.

Zé Elias represented the country at the 1996 Summer Olympics where he won bronze, and later at the 1996 CONCACAF Gold Cup in a runner-up finish, losing 0–2 in the final against Mexico.

Personal life
Elias' younger brother, Rubinho, is also a professional footballer. A goalkeeper, he played most of his career in Italy.

Honours

Club
Corinthians
Campeonato Paulista: 1995
Copa do Brasil: 1995

Inter
UEFA Cup: 1997–98

Olympiacos
Superleague Greece: 2000–01, 2001–02, 2002–03
Greek Football Cup: Runner-up 2000–01, 2001–02

Santos
Campeonato Brasileiro Série A: 2004

International
Brazil
CONCACAF Gold Cup: Runner-up 1996
Summer Olympic Games: Bronze medal 1996

References

External links

1976 births
Living people
Footballers from São Paulo
Brazilian footballers
Association football midfielders
Brazil international footballers
1996 CONCACAF Gold Cup players
Footballers at the 1996 Summer Olympics
Olympic footballers of Brazil
Olympic bronze medalists for Brazil
Olympic medalists in football
Campeonato Brasileiro Série A players
Sport Club Corinthians Paulista players
Santos FC players
Guarani FC players
Londrina Esporte Clube players
Bundesliga players
Bayer 04 Leverkusen players
Serie A players
Serie B players
Inter Milan players
Bologna F.C. 1909 players
Genoa C.F.C. players
Super League Greece players
Olympiacos F.C. players
FC Metalurh Donetsk players
Cypriot First Division players
AC Omonia players
Austrian Football Bundesliga players
SC Rheindorf Altach players
UEFA Cup winning players
Brazil under-20 international footballers
Brazilian expatriate footballers
Brazilian expatriate sportspeople in Germany
Expatriate footballers in Germany
Brazilian expatriate sportspeople in Italy
Expatriate footballers in Italy
Brazilian expatriate sportspeople in Greece
Expatriate footballers in Greece
Brazilian expatriate sportspeople in Ukraine
Expatriate footballers in Ukraine
Brazilian expatriate sportspeople in Cyprus
Expatriate footballers in Cyprus
Brazilian expatriate sportspeople in Austria
Expatriate footballers in Austria
Medalists at the 1996 Summer Olympics